Wegagen Bank SC is a bank in Ethiopia incorporated on 11 June 1997. It was established as a result of the entrepreneurial wit of sixteen 16 founding members who recognized the critical role that financial institutions would play towards creating a sustained economic development and were able to put in an initial paid-in capital of Birr thirty million (Birr 30 million).

Overview
Established under the banking proclamation of Licensing and Supervision, Proclamation No. 84/1994, the bank was registered with the National Bank of Ethiopia on 30 April 1997. The Memorandum and Articles of Association of the bank were signed on 15 April 1997 and registered with the Addis Ababa Bureau of Trade, Industry and Tourism on 15 April 1997, Registration Number 1/34/4/89.

The bank, as it started back then, operated through its head office located in Gofa Sefer, Addis Ababa. In October 2017, Wegagen moved to its 23 Storey Headquarters Building in front of Addis Ababa Stadium, Ras Mekonnen Street.

According to its website, the capital of the bank reached 1.8 billion Birr in 2016. Its deposits in 2013–14 exceeded 16 billion birr. Wegagen Bank is a medium-sized bank Wegagen with a network of 397 branches of which 144 are in Addis Ababa and the remaining 253 are located in other cities and towns of the country. To expand its service coverage, the bank keeps on opening additional branches both in Addis Ababa and regional towns. Wegagen Bank is a pioneer to introduce a core banking system as of July 2000, thereby managing to network the head office and all branches. Through its versatile ISO Standard Core Banking System, the bank is now delivering more efficient services to its customers. The system has also enabled the bank to provide technology-based banking services such as card payment services (through ATM & POS), internet banking as well as mobile banking services.

Its headquarters, a modern building completed recently, is located at the central financial hub of Addis Ababa. It is one of eight banks in Ethiopia that has launched an agent banking system.

References

External links
 Official Website

Banks of Ethiopia
1997 establishments in Ethiopia
Companies based in Addis Ababa